Freisa is a red Italian wine grape variety grown in the Piedmont region of north-west Italy, primarily in Monferrato and in the Langhe, but also further north in the provinces of Turin and Biella. Freisa is a vigorous and productive vine whose round, blue-black grapes are harvested in early October. The three-lobed leaves are relatively small and the bunches are elongated in form. By the 1880s it had become one of the major Piedmontese grapes, and in that period its cultivation was stimulated by the vine’s resistance to the downy mildew caused by the Plasmopara viticola fungus. Wines made from the Freisa grape are red and usually somewhat sweet and lightly sparkling, or foaming. Still and fully sparkling versions are also produced, however, as are dry and more decidedly sweet styles. In the Canavese there is also a rosé which can be made primarily from Freisa according to Denominazione di origine controllata (DOC) regulations.

History
Plantings of Freisa in the Piedmont region date back to at least the 18th century and ampelographers believe that the grape likely originated there in the hills between Asti and Turin. Recent DNA profiling by the University of California, Davis revealed that Freisa has a parent-offspring relationship with Nebbiolo. There are two major clonal varieties of Freisa-a small berried clone known as Freisa Piccolo which is more widely planted and a larger berry Freisa Grossa or Freisa di Nizza that tends to be planted on flatter, fertile terrain and produced less distinguished wine. Freisa di Chieri is potentially its own sub-variety of Freisa Piccolo grown in the Chieri region and distinguished by its own DOC. It creates a very perfumed, deep colored and tannic wine.

Relationship to other grapes
Through its parent-offspring relationship with Nebbiolo, Freisa is a half-sibling of several Piemontese wine grape varieties including: Vespolina, Brugnola, Bubbierasco, Nebbiolo rosé, Negretta, Neretto di Bairo and Rossola nera.

Viticulture
Freisa is a vigorous and productive vine whose round, blue-black grapes are harvested in early October. The three-lobed leaves are relatively small and the bunches are elongated in form. The vine is highly resistance to peronospora but has some susceptibility to oidium. It grows best in well exposed, sunny sites on hillsides.

Wines
Similar to Nebbiolo, Freisa produces wines with considerable tannins and acidity. While it can be used in blends, it is most often encountered as a varietal. Traditionally Freisa was produced as a slightly sparkling wine with some noticeable sweetness. To balance the bitterness from the grape and aging on its lees, the wines would be made with a small amount of residual sugar and allowed to go through a secondary fermentation to create a limited amount of frothiness. This bitter/sweet dynamic has brought Freisa its share of fans and critics with wine experts such Hugh Johnson describing the wine as being "immensely appetizing" to Robert M. Parker, Jr. describing Freisa as producing "totally repugnant wines".

Modern winemaking technology has introduced techniques to minimize some of the bitter tannins and ferment the wine fully dry. These include temperature control fermentation vessels and aging in oak barrels. Like Nebbiolo, Freisa produces a relatively light colored wine but with more distinctive purple hues. The wines are often characterized with strawberry, raspberry and violet aromas.

Freisa Nebbiolata
Freisa Nebbiolata is a specialty wine of the Piedmont region made in a ripasso style. In this style, the Fresia must is fermented with left over Nebbiolo skins from the production of Barolo. This creates a highly tannic wine with the potential for complex flavors.

Wine regions
Freisa is seen rarely outside of its Piedmont homeland, though there are a few hundred acres of the vine planted in Argentina carried over to South America by Italian immigrants. Even within Piedmont its acreage is declining. It is most commonly found in the Asti, Langhe, Monferrato and Pinerolese regions.

List of DOC wines employing the Freisa grape
100% Freisa:
 in the province of Asti
 Freisa d'Asti
 Freisa d'Asti superiore
 in the province of Cuneo
 Langhe Freisa
 Langhe Freisa Vigna
 in the Province of Turin
 Freisa di Chieri amabile
 Freisa di Chieri frizzante
 Freisa di Chieri secco
 Freisa di Chieri spumante
 Freisa di Chieri superiore

85%–100% Freisa:
In the provinces of Asti and Alessandria
 Monferrato Freisa
 Monferrato Freisa novello
 Monferrato rosso
In the provinces of Cuneo and Turin
 Pineronese Freisa

Wines which may be made primarily from Freisa (at least 60%), or from which it may be absent:
In the provinces of Biella and Turin
 Canavese rosato
 Canavese rosso

Other wines which may include smaller percentages of Freisa:
In the province of Asti
 Albugnano rosato (0%–15% Freisa)
 Albugnano rosso (0%–15% Freisa)
 Albugnano superiore (0%–15% Freisa)
 Malvasia di Castelnuovo Don Bosco, in still and spumante versions (0%–15% Freisa)
 Grignolino d'Asti (0%–10% Freisa)
In the province of Alessandria
 Grignolino del Monferrato Casalese (0%–10% Freisa)

Synonyms
Synonyms for Freisa include Monferrina, Monfreisa, Fessietta, Freisa di Chieri, Fresa, and Spannina.

References

External links
 Unione produttori vini albesi :: Fresia 
 :it:Freisa d'Asti , from the Italian Wikipedia
 :it:Categoria:Vini DOC e DOCG prodotti con uva Freisa 
 www.enotime.it/zoom :: Il Freisa 

Red wine grape varieties
Wine grapes of Italy